Matthew "Matt" Glantz (born November 26, 1971) is a professional poker player from Lafayette Hill, Pennsylvania.

Glantz has had success at the World Series of Poker and other poker tournaments. At the 2005 World Series of Poker, Glantz finished runner-up to Andre Boyer, which was also his highest finish in a WSOP tournament, in the $3,000 No Limit Hold'em event which earned him $364,620.

His biggest cash at the World Series of Poker was in 2008, where he finished 4th in the $50,000 H.O.R.S.E. world championship and earned $568,320. On October 2, 2009, he won the European Poker Tour High Roller tournament in London for $866,537.

As of 2011, his total live tournament winnings are almost $3,700,000. His 11 cashes at the WSOP account for $1,342,247 of those winnings.

Glantz has three children: A daughter named Avery a son named Harrison and another son named Brady. Glantz also recently adopted another baby son named James

References

1971 births
American poker players
People from Montgomery County, Pennsylvania
Living people